The Central Colleges of the Philippines, Inc. also referred to by its acronym CCP is a private, nonsectarian coeducational higher education institution located in Quezon City, Metro Manila, Philippines. CCP was established in January 18, 1954, and named the Polytechnic Colleges of the Philippines, Inc. (PCP), with an enrollment of 300 students. CCP has eleven academic programs or colleges at present.

History

Central Colleges of the Philippines started its operations upon its establishment on January 18, 1954, with an enrollment of 300 students. It was then known as the Polytechnic Colleges of the Philippines, Inc. (PCP). It was established by a group of prominent educators: (1) Mech. Engr. Manuel Ignacio Felizardo; DPWH Secretary during late Pres. Ramon Magsaysay, (2) Civil Engr. Vicente "Inte" Y. Orosa Sr., a civil engineering professorial lecturer from FEU Institute of Technology and Mapua University. Served DPWH (1911-1957) 46 years government employee served under six presidents and college founder H.R. Reyes convinced & offered him college presidency but decline, one of his son also alumni of the college of engineering 1959 B.S. Chemical Eng'g and Master Mason of Freemason & Knight of Rizal Orders; (3) Electronic & Comm. Engr. Ciriaco Ygnacio Coronel; (4) Juris Dr. Emilio M. Javier Sr., a graduate of Silliman University A.B. in 1915, admitted to Integrated Bar of the Philippines in July 1919 and obtained his Sc.D. in Jurisprudence from University of Michigan in 1932 and founding dean of Silliman University College of Law in 1935 and past vice-presidential candidate during 1941 Philippine General Election and running mate for presidential candidate Juan M. Sumulong Sr. during 2nd Philippine National election of the Commonwealth of the Philippines against re-electionist Manuel L. Quezon Sr. and running mate for Vice-Presidential Candidate Sergio Omena Sr., but lost to Osmena Sr. Landslide Votes of 1.4 Million Margin; Also Past First College Founding President in 1952-1959 of Philippine Christian College (PCC) Now Philippine Christian University Taft ave., Manila; (5) Civil Engr. Gonzalo T. Vales, a graduate of Bachelor of Arts in 1913 from Silliman University, also awardee of Outstanding Sillimanian Alumni and earned Bachelor in Civil Engineering from  University of Southern California in 1917 and freemason member, he is the niece of Evelyn Armanda Vales, First Filipina Graduate of A.B. in Arch. from USC in 1958 and founding President of Philippine Society of Civil Engineers Now Philippine Institute Civil Engineers, Inc. and co-founded and founding dean and former vice-president of Mapua University Manila 1925–1953 with first Filipino Registered Ar. Tomas B. Mapua, co-founded and First College President 1953-1969 and past founding dean of College of Engineering and two daughters Late Rebecca S. Vales was college registrar emeritus and Rachel S. Vales was college alumni director emeritus. On 50th Founding  Anniversary 2004-2005 School Board of Trustees approved Board Resolution to renamed the Engineering Building to Engr. Gonzalo T. Vales Hall. During the 1960s, the College of Arts and Science and the College of Business Administration were established.

In 1969,  Civil Engr. Hermenegildo "Dean Reyes" R. Reyes Sr. as 2nd College President and past dean of the FEU Institute of Technology succeeded by his grandnephew Dr. Nicanor M. Reyes Jr., a past regent of UP Board of Regent in 1962, past president of University of the Philippines Alumni Association, founding president of UP Alumni Engineers in 1945-47 and past president Upsilon Beta Phi Alumni and past president of Philippine Chamber of Commerces, founded of H.R. Reyes Construction, Inc. and graduate of University of the Philippines Bachelor of Science in Civil Engineering (BSCE) 1928, School Board of Trustees Chairman Dr. Hermenegildo R. Reyes Sr. a nephew of Educator Dr. Nicanor B. Reyes Sr. founding president of Far Eastern University, born to Paulino Z. Reyes and Marcela S. Reyes. His paternal grandparent Numeriano Somo Reyes and Rosario Zuniga-Reyes. In January 1971, Dr. Reyes, successfully buy out shared of 20% of his Co-founder Engr. Vales and other majority Shareholders, he finally control ownerships & renamed the corporate name of the school from Polytechnic Colleges of the Philippines, Inc. to Central Colleges of the Philippines, Inc.. Expansion of the colleges and More degree programs were added, such as Secretarial Administration Agricultural Business Management, and Doctor of Optometry being offered during the tenure of Dr. Reyes. He held his position in 1969–1979. His eldest son succeeding as Third College President in 1980–present, Ateneo Law School, FEU Institute of Law (1964-1974) and UP College of Law Professor for 1964–1991, Atty. Crispino "Babes" P. Reyes Sr., a graduate of Pre-Law from University of the Philippines Diliman in 1958 and 1962 of LL.B. in Ateneo de Manila University and LL.M. in 1966 from University of Michigan and admitted in Integrated Bar of the Philippines  in 1964, Senior Partner his Law firm Pacis & Reyes Attorneys 1978–present and married Elena Santos-Reyes has a son named Crispino Santos Reyes Jr. or Crispino "Eric" S. Reyes, III  or his younger brother Hermenegildo Pacis Reyes Jr. (future 4th College President). Also Board Chairman emeritus of Ateneo Law Alumni Association, Inc. and currently Board Chairman with Atty. Antonio C. Pacis President of Legis Forum Inc. at age of 81 years old still active in Board Meeting.

Campuses

CCP has two campuses, the Main Hermenegildo R. Reyes Campus and the Consorcia P. Reyes (extension) Campus.

The Main H.R. Campus houses the following.
 The Paulino Z. Reyes (PR) Hall houses the College of Arts and Science, Education, Accountancy, and Business Administration. It has the admission office, Guidance and Counseling Office, P.E. department, and the typing rooms.
 The Engr. Gonzalo T. Vales (GV) Hall (Also called Engineering Building) houses the College of Engineering and Optometry.
 The Dr. Hermenegildo R. Reyes (HR) Hall (Also named as CCP Computer Science Building) houses the College of Computer Studies and Architecture. It also houses the DynEd laboratory room, CTC laboratory rooms, AutoCAD room, Chemistry and Physics laboratory, Drawing Rooms, President's Office, Cashier's Office, Accounting Office, and Studio Theater.
 The CyberPort (old location of PCP Bldg. Demolished) the canteen and the CyberPort — a laboratory where the students can do their research and communicate with their friends for free.
 The Antonino Z. Reyes Hall (First and old Main Bldg.) has the school's college main library, the Registrar's Office and CCPAAI Office of the Alumni.

The Extension Campus houses the Consorcia P. Reyes Hall, which houses the High School Department, College of Nursing, gym, and ELC (English Learning Center). It will house the College of Hotel and Restaurant Management and the College of Tourism.

Academics

Accreditation
Central Colleges of the Philippines is accredited by the Commission on Higher Education (CHED), Philippine Association of Educators, and Philippine Association of Colleges and Universities Commission on Accreditation (PACUCOA Level 2 re-accreditation).

Libraries 
There are three libraries in CCP: the Main Library (Antonino Z. Reyes Hall), Graduate Studies Library (Antonino Z. Reyes Hall), and the Nursing Library (Consorcia P. Reyes Hall or the Extension Campus).

Topnotchers 
Board Exam Topnotchers

 1st Place - 1996 Electrical Engineering Board Exam - Engr. Belino Dagalea  
 5th Place - 2017 May-Civil Engineering Board Exam -Engr Robert Arago Jr.
 1st Place - 2014 ECT Board - Engr. Jann Ivan Asaula
 5th Place - 2014 LET Examination Board - Ramon Cristobal
 8th Place - 2013 Architect Board Exam - Arc. Rosario Dela Paz
 10th Place - 2013 ECE Board Exam - Engr. Alexander Macatual

Student life

Athletics 
Athletics includes badminton, basketball, cheerleading, chess, karate, table tennis, and volleyball.

The men's volleyball team won the 2005-2006 CUSA Volleyball Championship.  They defeated St. Jude College 3–1 in a best of 3 finals.  CCP has won 6 championships (1997–1998, 1998–1999, 1999–2000, 2002–2003, and 2005–2006)

The CCP Bobcats Pep Squad won the National Cheerleading Championship (NCC) in 2007-2010, 2012-2016, and 2018 and then, they were replaced by N.U. Team.
 
CCP Karate Club works under the Shotokan Karate International Federation (SKIF).  The Karate team has been associated with SKIF since 1994.  In 1992 the Karate Club won their first IWABUCHI CUP.   From 1993 to 1994 the Karate Club won consecutive championships of the Private Schools Athletic Association.

References

Further reading
Official website

Educational institutions established in 1954
Universities and colleges in Quezon City
1954 establishments in the Philippines